Vilis Daudziņš (born 7 November 1970) is a Latvian actor. In the theatre, he has appeared in several plays of Alvis Hermanis and Māra Ķimele, produced in New Riga Theatre. He has also taken part in several films.

Filmography

External links

Vilis Daudziņš at Jaunais Rīgas teātris homepage

1970 births
Living people
Latvian male television actors
Latvian male film actors
Latvian male stage actors
Actors from Riga
21st-century Latvian male actors
Lielais Kristaps Award winners